Ophelia Ofori Amankwaah known widely as Afia Amankwaah Tamakloe is a Ghanaian TV and radio personality, journalist and a health advocate. She was adjourned the Best Health Reporter at the 25th GJA Awards. She is the host of Nkwa Hia, Nyinsen Ne Awo and M'ahyɛaseɛ on Adom FM/TV.

Awards and nominations

Personal life 
She is married to Mr. Larry Tamakloe and they both have two kids, Laureen and Kurt.

References

External links 
 
 

Living people
Ghanaian television presenters
Ghanaian women television presenters
Ghanaian radio presenters
Ghanaian women radio presenters
Year of birth missing (living people)
Konongo Odumase Senior High School alumni